Paula Zsidi (born 1952) is a Hungarian archeologist, art historian, author, and museologist. 

She served as the museum director of Aquincum Museum in Budapest from 1989 until 2015. Zsidi has published over 170 articles, exhibition catalogues, and studies, her work often focuses on Aquincum, the Roman Empire, Transdanubia, and Hungarian history.

Awards 
 1998 – Bálint Kuzsinszky Memorial Medal 
 2002 – Arnold Ipolyi Science Development Award (OTKA) 
 2003 – Ferenc Móra Award (museum) 
 2009 – István Schönvisner Award
 2014 – Honorary citizen of Óbuda-Békásmegyer neighborhood, Budapest, Hungary
 2017 – Pro Urbe Budapest

Publications 
A select list of publications by Zsidi:

References 

1952 births
Hungarian art historians
Eötvös Loránd University alumni
Hungarian art directors
Living people
Hungarian women archaeologists